is a Japanese voice actress who is affiliated with 81 Produce. She started her career following her selection as one of the finalists in an audition held by 81 Produce. She is known for her roles as Momoka Yashiro in Gundam Build Divers, Misa Ilioroagu in The Misfit of Demon King Academy, and Miyako Muguruma in Warlords of Sigrdrifa. She is also a member of the idol group Dialogue+.

Career
Hieda was born in Kanagawa Prefecture on January 15, 1997. Her activities as a voice actress began in 2012, when she participated in a voice acting audition held by the talent agency 81 Produce. Out of 1,672 participants, she was selected as one of the 23 finalists, and received a Special Award as well as an award sponsored by the publishing company Shogakukan.

In 2016, Hieda officially became affiliated with 81 Produce. In 2018, she played the role of Momoka Yashiro in the anime series Gundam Build Fighters. That same year, she became part of a 3x3 basketball team for voice actors. In 2019, she became part of the idol group Dialogue+, which is composed of seven other rookie voice actresses; the group's first single  was released on October 23, 2019 and the title song was used as the opening theme of the anime series High School Prodigies Have It Easy Even In Another World. She also began playing the role of Maika Takatori in the mobile game Cue!, which she reprised in its anime adaptation. In 2020, she was cast as the character Misa Ilioroagu in the anime series The Misfit of Demon King Academy and as Miyako Muguruma in the anime series Warlords of Sigrdrifa. In 2021, she played the role of Yuzu Izumi in Bottom-tier Character Tomozaki, and the lead role of Dōki-chan in Ganbare Dōki-chan. In 2022, Hieda was one of the winners of the Best New Actress Award at the 16th Seiyu Awards.

Filmography

Television animation
2018
Pop Team Epic as Girlfriend (episode 6)
Yowamushi Pedal Glory Line as Female student (episode 10)
Gundam Build Divers as Momoka Yashiro
Real Girl as Female student (episode 6)
Kiratto Pri Chan as Amechans
How Not to Summon a Demon Lord as Friend (episode 7) 
Layton Mystery Tanteisha: Katori no Nazotoki File as Nero (young, episode 21) 

2019
Kakegurui – Compulsive Gambler as Vice Chairman of Election Administration, Gal student B (episode 9)
We Never Learn as Schoolgirl A, Schoolgirl B
Wasteful Days of High School Girls as Boy (episode 3)
Mix: Meisei Story as Female student C (episode 16)

2020
22/7 as Student (episode 11)
The Misfit of Demon King Academy as Misa Ilioroagu
Warlords of Sigrdrifa as Miyako Muguruma

2021
Bottom-tier Character Tomozaki as Yuzu Izumi

2022
Cue! as Maika Takatori
Skeleton Knight in Another World as Ponta
Love After World Domination as Misaki Jingūji

2023
The Reincarnation of the Strongest Exorcist in Another World as Amu
Ippon Again! as Anna Nagumo
Too Cute Crisis as Nazuna Endō
Chained Soldier as Yachiho Azuma

Original net animation
2021
Ganbare Dōki-chan as Dōki-chan

Video games
2017
Azur Lane as HMS Elbe
Mobile Legends: Bang Bang as Layla
Grand Summoners as Riffily, Catemira
Shirohime Quest as Yamajō Akutagawa
Shinyaku Arcana Slayer as Kanami
Destiny of Crown as Masamune
2019
Cue! as Maika Takatori
2020
Last Period as Lulu
Shinobi Master Senran Kagura: New Link as Ranmaru
Sakura Kakumei: Hanasaku Otome-tachi as Kyōko Toribe

References

External links
Official agency profile 

1997 births
81 Produce voice actors
Living people
Japanese video game actresses
Japanese voice actresses
Japanese women's basketball players
Seiyu Award winners
Voice actresses from Kanagawa Prefecture